Miguel Dachelet (born 16 January 1988) is a Belgian professional footballer who plays as a defender for FC Wiltz 71 in the Luxembourg Division of Honour.

External links 
 Guardian Football
 
 

1988 births
Living people
Belgian footballers
Belgian expatriate footballers
Belgian Pro League players
Challenger Pro League players
Luxembourg Division of Honour players
Standard Liège players
S.V. Zulte Waregem players
Lierse S.K. players
K.S.K. Heist players
FC Wiltz 71 players
Footballers from Liège
Association football defenders
Belgian expatriate sportspeople in Luxembourg
Expatriate footballers in Luxembourg
R.F.C. Meux players